Linear IgA bullous dermatosis is a rare immune-mediated blistering skin disease frequently associated with medication exposure, especially vancomycin, with men and women being equally affected.  It was first described by Tadeusz Chorzelski in 1979 and may be divided into two types:
 Adult linear IgA disease is an acquired, autoimmune blistering disease that may present with a clinical pattern of vesicles indistinguishable from dermatitis herpetiformis, or with vesicles and bullae in a bullous pemphigoid-like appearance. This disease can often be difficult to treat even with usually effective medications such as rituximab.
 Childhood linear IgA disease (also known as "Chronic bullous disease of childhood") is an acquired, self-limited bullous disease that may begin by the time the patient is age 2 to 3 and usually remits by age 13.

See also
 Skin lesion
 List of cutaneous conditions
 List of target antigens in pemphigoid
 List of immunofluorescence findings for autoimmune bullous conditions

References

External links 

Autoimmune diseases
Drug eruptions
Chronic blistering cutaneous conditions